Leptogorgia is a genus of soft coral in the family Gorgoniidae.  The genus has a widespread distribution with members being found in the eastern Atlantic Ocean from Western Europe to South Africa, the Mediterranean Sea, the Atlantic coasts of North and South America, the Antilles and the Pacific coast of America. Species are found in both shallow and deep waters.

Leptogorgia is a slow growing sea whip and are easily damaged. They are easily damaged by storms and fishing agriculture.

An as yet unnamed species of Leptogorgia was discovered off the coast of Sonoma County, California in November 2014, near the Gulf of the Farallones and Cordell Bank National Marine Sanctuaries.

Species
The World Register of Marine Species lists the following species:

References 

Gorgoniidae
Cnidarian genera
Taxa named by Henri Milne-Edwards